Public Health Scotland (PHS) is the national public health body for Scotland. It is a Special NHS Health Board, and it is jointly accountable to the Convention of Scottish Local Authorities (COSLA) and the Scottish Government. Fully exercising its functions from 1 April 2020 as Scotland's leading national agency for improving and protecting the health and well-being of all of Scotland's people, it is jointly sponsored by COSLA and the Scottish Government, and collaborates with third sector organisations.

Its role is to increase healthy life expectancy and reduce premature mortality. Areas of focus are COVID-19, mental health and well-being, community and place, and poverty and children.

The board's first chief executive is Angela Leitch, formerly chief executive of East Lothian Council.


Origins 
The board arose from a reorganisation of public health in Scotland, outlined in the 2015 Review of Public Health and further developed in the 2016 Health and Social Care Delivery Plan. Public Health Scotland came into existence on 7 December 2019 under the Public Health Scotland Order 2019 and then property, rights and liabilities were transferred to it on 1 April 2020.

A predecessor, Health Protection Scotland, continues to operate as part of Public Health Scotland. PHS also took over the functions of NHS Scotland's Information Services Division, providing statistics and data analysis.

See also
 Health in the United Kingdom
 List of national public health agencies

References

External links
 

Directorates of the Scottish Government#Health and Social Care
Executive agencies of the Scottish Government
Government agencies established in 2020
Health in Scotland
Public health in the United Kingdom
NHS Scotland
2020 establishments in Scotland
National public health agencies